Gurmeet Singh Meet Hayer is a two time member of the Punjab Legislative Assembly from Barnala constituency. He is a Cabinet Minister in the Government of Punjab. He first won the Legislative Assembly elections from the Aam Aadmi Party in 2017 by defeating the Indian National Congress's candidate Kewal Singh Dhillon. In the 2022 Legislative Assembly elections, he again won the Barnala constituency by a huge margin by securing almost 50% of the votes polled. He holds five important portfolios in the Mann ministry, wherein he is the Minister of the Departments of Higher Education & Languages, Governance Reforms, Sports & Youth Services , Science Technology & Environment and Printing & Stationery. He is also the incharge of the Youth Wing of the Aam Aadmi Party in Punjab.

His fields of interest are Sports, Environment & Climate Change and he is a wildlife lover who roots for the cause of Animal Welfare.

Member of the Legislative Assembly

First Term
Hayer was first elected as an MLA in the 2017 Punjab Legislative Assembly election.  He represented the Barnala Assembly constituency in the Punjab Legislative Assembly.

Committee assignments of Punjab Legislative Assembly
Chairman (2021–22) Committee on Estimates

Second Term
Hayer was re-elected as the MLA from Barnala Assembly constituency in the 2022 Punjab Legislative Assembly election with getting almost 50% of the votes polled giving him a comprehensive win over his nearest rival. The Aam Aadmi Party gained a strong 79% majority in the sixteenth Punjab Legislative Assembly by winning 92 out of 117 seats in the 2022 Punjab Legislative Assembly election. MP Bhagwant Mann was sworn in as Chief Minister on 16 March 2022. Hayer took oath as a Cabinet Minister along with nine other MLAs on 19 March at Guru Nanak Dev auditorium of Punjab Raj Bhavan in Chandigarh.

As a cabinet minister in the Mann ministry, Hayer was initially given the charge of three departments of the Punjab Government:
 Department of School Education (March - July 2022)
 Department of Sports and Youth Services
 Department of Higher Education and Languages

On 5 July, Bhagwant Mann announced the expansion of his cabinet of ministers with five new ministers to the departments of Punjab state government. Hayer has now been given the charge of following departments.

On 7 January 2023, during the cabinet reshuffle,his portfolios were changed and he has now been given the charge of following departments.

Electoral Performance

References

External links
 Constituencies
 Results

Living people
Punjab, India MLAs 2017–2022
Place of birth missing (living people)
People from Barnala
Aam Aadmi Party politicians from Punjab, India
1989 births
Punjab, India MLAs 2022–2027
Mann ministry
Education Ministers of Punjab, India